Vladimír Kobranov (4 October 1927 – 25 October 2015) was an ice hockey player for the Czechoslovakian national team.

He won a silver medal at the 1948 Winter Olympics and a gold medal at the 1949 world championship. In 1950 he was imprisoned with other Czech hockey players by the communist government. His career and careers of his colleagues were ended by the communist regime. In 2009 he was introduced in the Czech Ice Hockey Hall of Fame.

References

External links

1927 births
2015 deaths
Czechoslovak emigrants to Switzerland
HC Dynamo Pardubice players
Ice hockey players at the 1948 Winter Olympics
Medalists at the 1948 Winter Olympics
Olympic ice hockey players of Czechoslovakia
Olympic medalists in ice hockey
Olympic silver medalists for Czechoslovakia
People from Černošice
People convicted of treason against Czechoslovakia
Sportspeople from the Central Bohemian Region
Czechoslovak ice hockey right wingers
Czech ice hockey coaches
Czech ice hockey right wingers
Czechoslovak ice hockey coaches